Group C of the 2000 Fed Cup Americas Zone Group II was one of four pools in the Americas Zone Group II of the 2000 Fed Cup. Three teams competed in a round robin competition, with each team being assigned to its respective play-off region.

Puerto Rico vs. Bermuda

Guatemala vs. Jamaica

Puerto Rico vs. Guatemala

Bermuda vs. Jamaica

Puerto Rico vs. Jamaica

Guatemala vs. Bermuda

See also
Fed Cup structure

References

External links
 Fed Cup website

2000 Fed Cup Americas Zone